The Qiongzhusian age is a regional subdivision (in China) of Cambrian Series 2 Stage 3; it is correlated with late Atdabanian rocks elsewhere and overlain by the Canglangpuian age.

References

Cambrian geochronology	
Geological ages
Cambrian Series 2